The 2009–10 Hawaii Rainbow Wahine basketball team represented the University of Hawaii at Mãnoa in the 2009–10 NCAA Division I women's basketball season. The Rainbow Wahine, coached by Dana Takahara-Dias, are a member of the Western Athletic Conference.

Offseason
May 28: Former University of Hawaii women’s basketball player and assistant Dana Takahara-Dias has been selected as the school’s new head women’s basketball coach. Takahara-Dias was a four-year UH letterwinner from 1984 to 1988. She is the program’s seventh head coach since becoming a varsity sport in 1974 and first woman head coach since Patsy Dung (1974–79).
June 16: Shawna Kuehu signed a scholarship agreement for the 2009-10 season. Kuehu won three state titles at Punahou School. She was named the State Player of the Year her sophomore and senior seasons. In her freshman year, she was first team All-State. In the state championship game her sophomore season, she scored a record 37 points. Her senior year, she scored 20 points and grabbed 13 rebounds in the state title victory.

Exhibition

Regular season
The Rainbow Wahine will participate in several tournaments. The Jack in the Box Rainbow Wahine Classic will be held from November 27–29. The Hukilau Tournament will be played from December 4–5. On December 19, the school will participate in the Duel in the Desert. From December 29–31, the Rainbow Wahine will play in the Waikiki Beach Marriott Resort Classic.

Roster

Schedule

Player stats

Postseason

NCAA basketball tournament

Awards and honors

Team players drafted into the WNBA

References

Hawaii Rainbow Wahine basketball seasons
Hawaii
2009 in sports in Hawaii
2010 in sports in Hawaii